Lars Ivar Gran (born 1959) is a Norwegian sprint canoer who competed in the early to mid-1980s. He won a silver medal in the K-4 10000 m at the 1983 ICF Canoe Sprint World Championships in Tampere. 

He resides in Tønsberg.

References

1959 births
Living people
Norwegian male canoeists
ICF Canoe Sprint World Championships medalists in kayak
Sportspeople from Tønsberg